Uhlenbeck is a surname. Notable people with the surname include:

Christianus Cornelius Uhlenbeck (1866–1951), linguist and lecturer at the University of Leiden
George Eugene Uhlenbeck (1900–1988), Dutch-American physicist
Karen Uhlenbeck (born 1942), American mathematician

Dutch-language surnames